The  is a traditional Japanese skill toy. It consists of a handle (ken), a pair of cups (sarado), and a ball (tama) that are all connected together by a string. On one end of the ken is a cup, while the other end of ken is narrowed down, forming a spike (kensaki) that fits into the hole (ana) of the tama. The kendama is the Japanese version of the classic cup-and-ball game, and is also a variant of the French cup-and-ball game bilboquet. Kendama can be held in different grips, and many tricks and combinations can be performed. The game is played by tossing the ball into the air and attempting to catch it on the stick point.

The origins of kendama are disputed, but it is generally believed to have originated during the 17th or 18th century. Kendama started to evolve when it came to Japan during the Edo period, and since then the use of the toy has spread throughout the world. The size and materials used to create kendamas now vary as they are offered in jumbo and mini sizes, and have been created out of plastic, metal, and nylon. There are now kendama competitions held in countries all over the world, the biggest competition being the annual Kendama World Cup in Japan.

Terminology and structure

The kendama is traditionally made out of wood and comprises the following parts:
 Main body .
 Spike .
 Big cup .
 Base cup .
 Small cup .
 Ball .
 Hole .
 String  .
 Cup body .
 Small cup edge .
 Big cup for lunars .
 Slip-stop or slip grip .
 Back end .
 String attachment hole .

Stringing a Kendama 
"Stringing" a kendama is the action of connecting all three pieces of the kendama (ken, sarado, and tama) together. A bead (or mini bearing) and a piece of string are required to string a kendama. The steps to string a kendama are as follows:
 Take one end of the string and put it through the little hole in the tama until the string is coming through the big hole (ana).
 Put the bead on the end of the string coming out of the ana and tie a knot to lock the bead in.
 Put the untied end of the string through one of the two holes in the sarado. (Note: For a right-handed kendama, hold the sarado up so that the big cup is on the right side and put the string through the hole that is facing self. For a left-handed kendama, make sure the big cup is on the left side and put the string through the hole facing self).
Lead the string through the hole in the ken.
 Tie a knot at that end of the string so the string doesn't slip through the ken piece.
 Put the sarado down on top of the ken.

A video of this process can be found here

Grips 
A kendama can be held in numerous types of grips. Choosing the type of grip to hold the kendama depends on which trick a person wants to perform. Some of these grips include:

Ken grip: Hold the ken with all five fingers with the spike pointing upwards and the big cup (or small cup) facing towards the body
Sara grip: hold the ken by placing the thumb and index finger below the intersection of the sarado and ken
Sara grip (stabilized): In addition to the thumb and index finger placement, Place the middle and ring finger underneath the small cup or big cup (this depends on which way the ken is facing).
Tama grip: With the fingertips, hold the ball (tama) with the hole (ana) facing upwards.
Candle grip: Face the ken with the spike pointed downward. Hold the ken with three fingers: index, middle, and the thumb.

Gameplay 
The general concept of kendama is pulling the ken up and balancing the tama somewhere on the ken, or vice versa. There are not any specific rules on how to play kendama. However, bending the knees while playing kendama is a method that experts use. Endless tricks and trick combinations can be made with just ken grip, sara grip, tama grip, and candle grip by themselves or together in a combination. Some examples of tricks in each of these grips are as follows:

Ken Grip 
Spike: This trick involves the hole in the tama and the spike.
 Hold the ken with the spike pointing straight up
 Hold the ball with the off hand to ensure the ball is still before starting the motion of this trick
 Bend the knees
 Pull the tama up with the entire body
 Catch the ball in the spike by directing the spike underneath the hole in the tama

Swing Spike: a variation of the Spike.

 Hold the ken in a way similar to preparing a spike
 Hold the ball with the opposite hand and slightly bring it back towards the body, keeping the tension in the string 
 Let go of the ball and swing the ball out in front of self
 Tug the string a bit to make the ball rotate the hole 360° towards self
 Catch the tama on the spike by connecting the spike and the hole together.

Around Japan: This trick is a combination of the big cup, small cup, and the spike.

 Pull the ball up into the small cup
 Hop the ball over to the big cup by rotating the wrist to the right (and vice versa if left handed)
 Keep an eye on the hole, and hop the ball up onto the spike, connecting the hole and spike together
Note: The following combination is also ok: big cup→small cup→spike.

Note: This trick can also be done in sara grip.

Around the World: Similar to Around the Block, with the addition of the spike.
 Follow all the steps from "Around the Block"
 Keep an eye on the hole, and from the bottom cup, hop the ball up and catch the ball by landing the hole on to the spike

Both of these tricks can also be done in "sara grip."

Bird: This trick involves the ball, the hole, the spike, and the big cup or small cup edge. 
 Hold the ken with the spike facing upwards with the big cup (or small cup) facing towards self
 Tilt the kendama slightly away from self
 Bend the knees, and extend them while pulling the ball straight up
 Balance the hole of the ball on the big cup edge (or small cup edge) while the ball leans against the spike

Sara Grip 
Moshikame: This is a tricky combination of the big cup and bottom cup.
 Pull the ball up into the big cup
 Bend the knees and hop the ball up into the air
 While the ball is in mid-air, rotate the ken downwards so that the bottom cup is facing up
 Catch the ball in the bottom cup.

Clack back: This trick uses the big cup (or small cup) and the end of the handle.   
 Pull the ball up onto the big cup  
 Lean the ken about 45° downward so that the basecup turns starts to face toward the ground, causing the ball to start to fall off the big cup
 "Clack" (hit) the ball with the back end of the ken
 Catch the ball on the big cup

Tama Grip 
Airplane: This trick involves the hole in the ball and the spike. "Airplane" mirrors the movement pattern of "Swing Spike."
 Hold the ball with the hole facing upwards
 Grab the ken with the off hand to stabilize it
 With the offhand, slightly pull the ken back
 Release the ken with the off hand
 Pull ken in mid-air so it rotates 180° towards self, making the ken face downwards
 Catch the spike in the hole

Lighthouse: This trick involves the base cup and the ball.
 Hold the ken steady with the off hand to stabilize it
 Pull the ken gently upwards, having the ken rise above the tama and ensuring the ken stays stable throughout the movement
 Place the ball under the bottom cup as the ken rises higher than the ball
 Balance the ken on top of the ball

Candle Grip 

Candlestick: This trick involves the base cup.
 Pull or swing the ball upwards onto the bottom cup

History

Origins, Precursors, and Parallels

The origins of the game are disputed. It is believed by some to be a variant of the French ball-and-cup game bilboquet (bil "ball" boquet "small tree"), a toy that dates back to the 16th century and was popular in Europe during the 17th century. During that same period the kendama is believed to have arrived in Japan via the Silk Road from China during the Edo period (1600-1868), with some scholars specifying that it arrived between 1420-1500.

Hatsukaichi City in Hiroshima Prefecture is considered to be the birthplace of the modern Japanese Kendama due to the city becoming the first place for kendama manufacturing. Hamagatsu Ekusa created the shape of the kendama that is widely recognized today in 1919 in Kure city. During the early 20th century the toy had two side cups and was called a jitsugetsu ball ., literally translating to "sun and moon ball", because of the ball's representation of the sun and the cups' likeness to the crescent moon.

Models 
Despite not being originated in Japan, the shape of kendama that is known today was formed and evolved in Japan.

The dates of when the following 3 kendama models were made or seen are undocumented:

"Deer horn and ball" was the form that the kendama took on when it arrived in Japan for the first time, literally a deer horn attached to a ball. Later on, some people replaced the deer horn with a piece of bamboo due to deer horn costing too many resources, making the bamboo and ball. The next model started to resemble what the kendama looks like today: the ken and ball. This model was a ken piece strung to the ball.

The jisugetsu ball kendama model was the first model made by Ekusa (1919), and later went on to be produced as many as 300,000 times in one year by Hongo woodworking factory in Hatsukaichi (1921). The jisugetsu has a similar design as lined folk craft kendamas, which were made by factories that also produced Kokeshi dolls from spinning lathe machines. The strings of both the jisugetsu ball and folk craft kendamas were placed on the ken using a loose metal fitting, making the string prone to detaching or breaking.

The S (Shinma)-Type kendama was the first competition style kendama invented in 1975 by Hideo Shinma, the president of the Tokyo Kendama Club. The first S-type prototype emerged in 1976, and the Japan Kendama Association (JKA) asked Shinma to make them a competition style model based on the S-Type design in 1977.

The F (Fujiwara)-Type (F16) kendama emerged in 1978, invented by Issei Fujiwara. The F-Type incorporated new modifications unknown to kendamas at the time. The F-Type had two small holes drilled in the middle of each side of the sarado, and also used a sturdier string that was unlikely to break. The two string holes in the sarado offer more fluidity of play as well as the option to switch the kendama between left handed or right handed.

The Tortoise kendama by Tortoise, Inc. was a take on the S-type kendama after the S-type discontinued in 1990. Tortoise kendamas came in different models: the T-8,   T-14, T-16, and T-17. The numbers indicating each different Tortoise model corresponds with the height of each model in centimeters. Tortoise kendamas stopped production in 2012 due to not having enough resources.

The F16-2, the second version of the F16, was released in 2001. The main change in the F16-2 from the F16 is that the position of the string hole was moved slightly off from the cup body's center, enabling the kendama to turn and rotate in a new fluid way. This string hole adjustment is still used in various shapes of kendamas to this day.

Contemporary culture
Kendama has increased in popularity since its initial evolution in Japan. During the 2000s, kendama surged in popularity outside Japan, which influenced the creation of the first kendama companies in foreign countries.

The first kendama company in the United States was Kendama USA in 2006. They began to promote kendama in North America and were able to reach the winter sports, bmx, and rollerblading communities. Since its founding, Kendama USA has spread kendama worldwide and continues to do so.  

In 2010, the company Sweets Kendamas was founded in the USA in Minnesota by Matt "Sweets" Jorgenson. Sweets Kendamas' mission is to "Spread Kendama Love," and they also have done that over the years.

As for the European kendama scene, some kendama companies that emerged in the late 2000s were Kendama Europe in 2008. Kendama Europe's first competition model kendama came out in 2011, and they have worked to spread kendama throughout Germany by attending the Nuremberg-Germany toy fair. Another company that emerged in the late 2000s was KROM Kendama from Denmark in 2010.

Almost every kendama company has a team of sponsored players to help promote their brands. Sponsored players range in age and location around the world.

The kendama community connects through social media platforms such as Instagram, Youtube, Facebook, Tiktok, Twitch and Twitter.

Robotics
Kendama play has also been used as a measure of accuracy, agility, and learning ability in robotic arms.

Rules
There are no specific rules on how to play kendama. However, all forms of kendama competition are regulated by rules. 4 styles of kendama competition are speed ladder, open division, freestyle, and Kendama World Cup (KWC). It is rare that the KWC style of competing is used as an event other than KWC itself.

Speed Ladder 
The speed ladder is a style of competition that is a race of who can finish a set of tricks the fastest. Players will race through an order of tricks that they are given at the event or prior to the event via the internet. The players who finish the trick ladder the fastest wins. There are divisions that sign up to compete in based on their skill level (ex: beginner, intermediate, and advanced/pro).

Open Division 
Open Division is a head-to-head 1vs1 competition style format. Each round, two players compete against each other and take turns drawing a trick at random. Each trick drawn warrants a maximum of three exchanges – the number of times the players can go back and forth attempting the trick. The first player to 3 points wins.

 If a player completes the trick and the other player misses, the successful player earns 1 point and the other player draws another trick.
 If both players complete or miss the trick, then the 1st exchange comes to an end and the first player gets another attempt to complete the trick in the second bout, restarting the process. 
 If both players complete or miss the trick in all three bouts, then the trick is discarded and the second player draws a new trick. 

Note: In the final round, the first player to 5 points wins.

Note: The labeled champion of each event is usually referring to the Open Division winner.

Freestyle 

Freestyle is a head-to-head 1vs1 style of competition.  Each match is judged by a panel of three or five judges. The two players competing against each other in each round will take turns performing tricks in 45-second time periods twice each. During the time periods, both players may perform any trick that they choose.

Each judge individually decides which player wins based on who did the best in the following three categories: Creativity, Consistency, and Difficulty. The player with the most votes wins the round.

KWC 

One hundred and twenty tricks are released online prior to the KWC and are split up into groups of 10 tricks each 12 times, forming a level 1 to 12 trick list. The higher level a trick is, the more difficult it is and the more points it is worth. KWC is split into 2 days of competition: Day 1: Qualifying, and Day 2: Finals. Each day has its own set of rules.

During Day 1, all players choose 12 tricks from the levels 1–10 in the trick list. Players split the 12 tricks into two rounds of six tricks each, and each player will get 3 minutes for each round to complete as many tricks as possible. The 25 players with the highest point scores will advance to Day 2.

Note: The number of points each trick is worth is equivalent to the face value of the level of the trick (ex. level 6 trick is worth 6 points).

During Day 2, the players compete one by one from the lowest scoring qualifying player to the highest scoring qualifying player. Each player has three minutes to do an unlimited number of tricks from levels 3–12, and each trick can only be done once. The player who gets the highest number of points in their time period wins.

Note: The number of points each trick is worth is equivalent to the level of that trick squared (ex. level 6 trick is worth 36 points), with the exception of level 11 tricks (worth 151 points) and level 12 tricks (worth 194 points).

Competitions

Kendama competitions have been occurring since 1979, with the first competition being the All Japan Kendama-Do Championships held by the Japan Kendama Association. The British Kendama Association was the first group to hold a formal kendama contest outside Japan in 2008 at the British Juggling Convention in Doncaster. Kendama competitions have taken a variety of formats including speed ladders, freestyle, head-to-head, and world championship style.

Typically at these events, there are vendors that sell kendamas, clothing, and accessories. Competitions can range from 1–3 days long and prizes are provided for the 1st, 2nd, and 3rd place winners of each competition category. Popular competitions include the North American Kendama Open & the Kendama World Cup (KWC).

Kendama World Cup 

Starting in 2014, the Kendama World Cup (KWC) is an annual two-day event in the summer that takes place in Hatsukaichi, Hiroshima, Japan and is the largest kendama competition in the world. In 2018 alone, the KWC had an audience of 49,000 members that were watching 415 competitors from 18 countries compete for the title of Kendama World Champion.

At KWC, there is also an abundance of vendors selling their merchandise and kendamas, kendama games, and live performances all spread out over the 2 days of the event. Admission to the KWC is free.

Winners 

 2014: Bonz Atron (KROM Kendama)
 2015: Wyatt Bray (Kendama USA)
 2016: Bryson Lee (Sweets Kendamas)
 2017: So Kanada (Sweets Kendamas)
 2018: Nick Gallagher (Sweets Kendamas)
 2019: Rui Sora (Kendama USA)
 2020: Takuya Igarashi (Su-Lab, Kendama Israel)
 2021: Yasu (Krom Kendama)
 2022: Takuya Igarashi (Su-Lab, Kendama Israel)

North American Kendama Open 

Formerly known as the Minnesota Kendama Open, the North American Kendama Open (NAKO) has been an annual kendama event in Minnesota every Fall since 2013. The NAKO has developed in length over the years, going from a one day event in 2013-2014, to a two-day event in 2015–2017, to a three-day event in 2018–2019. The event has been hosted all over Minnesota; in 2013 it was held in Saint Paul, in the years 2014–2018 it was held in the Mall of America in Bloomington, and in 2019 it was hosted in Minneapolis at the Varsity Theater.

The forms of competition that the NAKO offers are:

 Beginner speed ladder
 Intermediate speed ladder
 Amateur open division
 Pro Open Division
 Freestyle

Each style of competition is split up into different times across each day of the event, so a portion of every competition is completed by the time each day ends. On the final day, a champion is crowned in all divisions.

Winners 

 2013: Max Norcross (Sweets Kendamas)
 2014: Lukas Funk (Sweets Kendamas)
 2015: Zack Gallagher (Sweets Kendamas)
 2016: Nick Gallagher (Sweets Kendamas)
 2017: So Kanada (Sweets Kendamas)
 2018: So Kanada (Sweets Kendamas)
 2019: Hiroto "Motty" Motohashi (Su Lab)
 2020: Nick Gallagher (Sweets Kendamas)
 2021: So Kanada (Sweets Kendamas)
 2022: Nick Gallagher (Sweets Kendamas)

Catch and Flow

Catch and Flow, Freestyle World Championship was first held in September 2014 in downtown Tokyo, Japan. Using a new format to determine the best freestyle skills in the world, the Catch and Flow defined a new way to perform freestyle kendama and to judge such style. Players from around the world apply to participate by listing their achievements. The top approx. 60 players are selected to perform for 90 seconds one by one. Judges determine 16 finalists who will go head to head with 2 x 45 seconds for each player in one-on-one battle towards the final.

Catch & Flow – World Freestyle Winners

 2014: Thorkild May / Denmark / KROM Kendama
 2015: Bonz Atron / USA / KROM Kendama
 2016: Jake Fischer / USA / KROM Kendama
 2017: Bonz Atron / USA / KROM Kendama
 2018: Bonz Atron / USA / KROM Kendama
 2019: Kaito Nakajima / Japan / Grain Theory
 2020: Takuya Igarashi / Japan / Su-Lab, Kendama Israel
 2021: Yasu / Japan / KROM Kendama
 2022: Shinnosuke Togo / Japan / JAC Kendama

Battle at the Border

The Battle at the Border is the longest-standing annual kendama competition in the United States. The event is currently hosted by Kentucky-based kendama company Sol Kendamas. The event occurs on the first weekend of January in Tennessee, USA.

In June 2011, the first public Kendama competition (battle) was held in the state of Tennessee. The event occurred in the city of Nashville hosted by a kendama blog called the "Kensession Stand". The event was called the "Nashville Kendama Battle", and was held at 12th South Taproom. 
In subsequent years, a group of kendama players called The Kendama Squad (Chad Covington, Nicholas Bellamy, and John Ross Rudolph) -- alongside the Kensession Stand (Tyler Marshall) -- hosted annual kendama battles in Clarksville, Tennessee. While the competition continued to occur annually, the name "Battle at the Border" was not implemented until the 2014 competition. In 2015, Sol Kendamas began officially coordinating the event. In 2015, the competition reached its largest attendance (approximately 150 people). Battle at the Border (2015-2016) was held in Nashville, Tennessee on the first weekend of January at Rocketown. Battle at the Border (2017-2018) was held on the first weekend of January at The Foundry in Nashville, TN. Battle at the Border returned to Rocketown and has continued to be hosted there since.

Battle at the Border Open Winners

 2012: Christian Fraser / USA / Sweets Kendamas
 2013: William Penniman / USA / Sweets Kendamas
 2014: Jake Fischer / USA / Krom Kendama
 2015: William Penniman / USA / Sweets Kendamas
 2016: Kevin DeSoto / USA / Sol Kendamas
 2017: Liam Rauter / USA / Sol Kendamas
 2018: Bonz Atron / USA / Krom Kendama
 2019: Liam Rauter / USA / Sol Kendamas
 2020: Alex Mitchell / USA / Sol Kendamas
 2021: Liam Rauter / USA / Sol kendamas
 2022: Liam Rauter / USA / Sol kendamas
 2023: Zack Gallagher / USA / Sweets Kendamas

Dama Fest

Dama Fest is North America's original and first large scale Kendama competition, hosted by Kendama USA.  The first Dama Fest was in 2011, and the second was in 2013.  Kendama players travelled from all over North America, Europe, and Japan.  Players competed in a single-elimination head-to-head bracketed format.

 2011 / Sebastian Orrego / USA / Unsponsored

 2013 / Keith Matsumura  / USA / Kendama USA

DKM – German Kendama Championship

Deutsche Kendama Meisterschaft DKM also called German Kendama Championship is the longest-standing annual Kendama competition in Europe. The first DKM was held in Berlin, 2014. Ever since then, the event has been organised, hosted and run by the german based company Kendama Europe. Each year the event is held in different locations and cities. The championship format relates to the original classic competition formats of the JKA (Japanese Kendama Association). 

It includes Speed trick competition, Knock out competition and Freestyle competition and is separated in three different skill levels: beginner, advance and pro.

The first winner of the Knock out Pro competition in Berlin, 2014, was Peter Wimmers.

See also 

Cup-and-ball
Juggling
Yo-yo
Poi
Diabolo

References

External links 

 Kendama USA
 Kendama Europe
 Sweets Kendamas
 KROM Kendama
 Active Kendama
 Sol Kendamas
 Kendama London
 Cereal Kendama
 Gloken Kendamas Network
 British Kendama Association
 Japanese Kendama Association

Physical activity and dexterity toys
Japanese games
Traditional toys
Wooden toys
Circus skills
Sports entertainment